Deadliest Catch: Alaskan Storm is a 2008 simulation computer game for the Xbox 360 and Microsoft Windows developed by American company Liquid Dragon Studios and published by Greenwave Games. The game was created by Northwestern Games.

Overview
Alaskan Storm is a game based on the television show Deadliest Catch. The game takes place in the Bering Sea. The player plan must manage navigation, maintenance of their boat, the hiring of crew members, and control their fishing.

Reception
Deadliest Catch: Alaskan Storm has received mixed reviews, including a passable 6.4 rating from IGN, a poor 4.0 score from GameSpot, and a 56 out of 100 score on Metacritic.

References

External links
Liquid Dragon Studios

2008 video games
Deadliest Catch
Multiplayer and single-player video games
Ship simulation games
Video games based on television series
Video games developed in the United States
Windows games
Xbox 360 games